Joshua Cole Prince (born January 26, 1988) is an American former professional baseball utility player who is currently a minor league hitting coach. He played in Major League Baseball (MLB) for the Milwaukee Brewers in 2013.

Playing career

Amateur baseball
Prince attended Alfred M. Barbe High School in Lake Charles, Louisiana. He was twice named to the All-Louisiana team, and graduated in 2006. He enrolled at the University of Texas at Austin, where he played college baseball for the Texas Longhorns baseball team as a freshman. He was named a Freshman All-American. After his freshman year, Prince transferred to Tulane University, and he continued his college baseball career with the Tulane Green Wave baseball team. He also played summer collegiate baseball for the Green Bay Bullfrogs of the Northwoods League in 2008.

Milwaukee Brewers
The Milwaukee Brewers selected Prince in the third round, with the 105th overall selection, of the 2009 Major League Baseball Draft. Prince started his professional career with the Helena Brewers of the Rookie-level Pioneer League in 2009; he was moved up to the Wisconsin Timber Rattlers of the Class A Midwest League during the season. Prince was promoted to the Brevard County Manatees of the Class A-Advanced Florida State League in 2010 and 2011. He was moved to centerfield while at Brevard County. He played the 2012 season with the Huntsville Stars of the Class AA Southern League. After the 2012 regular season, the Brewers assigned Prince to the Phoenix Desert Dogs of the Arizona Fall League (AFL). Prince led the AFL in hits.

The Brewers added him to their 40-man roster after the 2012 season. Prince began the 2013 season with the Nashville Sounds of the Class AAA Pacific Coast League. He was called up to the major leagues on April 6, 2013, to replace the injured Aramis Ramírez. He was outrighted off the roster on October 4, 2013.

Prince spent the 2014 season with Huntsville, and became a free agent after the season.

Other teams
On March 22, 2015, the Detroit Tigers signed Prince to a minor league contract. He was released on June 20, 2015.

After being released by the Tigers, Prince signed with the Bridgeport Bluefish of the Atlantic League of Professional Baseball for the remainder of the 2015 season.

On April 6, 2016, Prince signed with the Sugar Land Skeeters of the Atlantic League. Prince resigned with the Skeeters for the 2017 season.

In January 2018, Prince signed a minor league contract with the Arizona Diamondbacks.

On January 18, 2019, Prince re-signed with the Sugar Land Skeeters as a player-coach. He was released on May 10, 2019. 

On May 17, 2019, Prince signed as a player-coach with the Texas AirHogs of the American Association.

On July 7, 2019, Prince's contract was purchased by the Arizona Diamondbacks. He elected free agency on November 7, 2019.

Post-playing career
In January 2020, Prince was named hitting coach of the Greenville Drive, a Class A farm team of the Boston Red Sox.

He was named as the hitting coach of the FCL Red Sox for the 2022 season.

Personal life
Prince's older brothers, Ran and Dooley, both played college baseball.

References

External links

1988 births
Living people
Brevard County Manatees players
Helena Brewers players
Huntsville Stars players
Milwaukee Brewers players
Nashville Sounds players
Texas Longhorns baseball players
Tulane Green Wave baseball players
Wisconsin Timber Rattlers players
Bridgeport Bluefish players
Sugar Land Skeeters players
Jackson Generals (Southern League) players
Reno Aces players
Texas AirHogs players